Tawaan is a Pakistani television drama serial produced by Momina Duraid Productions and directed by Syed Wahb Jafri. It was first aired on 5 July 2018 on Hum TV. It is written by Rahat Jabeen. It stars Moomal Khalid and Emmad Irfani in lead roles while Asad Siddiqui as second lead.

It marks Hina Altaf's third on-screen appearance with Asad Siddiqui after Gumrah and Sodai, with Emmad Irfani after Aik Thi Misaal and Kuch Na Kaho and with Moomal Khalid after Natak. Siddiqui and Irfani also appeared together in Mah-e-Tamaam.

Story 
Shehroze and Mahnoor are a happily engaged couple who are in love since their childhood. They are soon to get married, however, Mahnoor is accidentally hit by the car of a spoilt young man Zaman. The injuries prove fatal and Mahnoor dies, leaving Shehroze shattered.

Driven by revenge, Shehroze is determined to make Zaman compensate the loss by killing Zaman's fiancée, Maryam. Shehroze therefore kidnaps Maryam and is about to crush her under his car but stops. Shehroze cannot do such a cruel thing to an innocent soul so he just leaves, without harming Maryam in any way.
After that Shehroz was embarrassed. And Maryam had no choice because people always blamed her innocence because she was kidnapped. So she asked Shehroz to compensate his mistake by marrying her. Shehroz agreed and then they start living happily, although Shehroze maintains a certain distance from Maryam because he wants to stay loyal to his lady love Mahnoor.

Then later on Shehroze tells Maryam that she will always be a tawaan to him and therefore she leaves him and asks for a divorce however Shehroze doesn't want to get divorced as he actually is starting to love and doesn't want her to leave. Maryam hears Shehroze and his aunty Shabana talking about Maryam and how he loves her so much and can't live without her. Shabana then tells him that he should take Maryam back as she realises how upset everyone is that she left in the first place. Shehroze goes to Maryam's house and sees Zaman talking to her about getting together and then Shehroze walks in and Zaman then shoots Maryam. Maryam is then taken to hospital and survives and Shehroze confesses his love for her. Then Maryam and Shehroze get back together and everyone lives happily ever after.

Cast
Emmad Irfani as Shahroz
Moomal Khalid as Maryam
Asad Siddiqui as Zaman
Hina Altaf Khan as Mahnoor/Mano (Dead)
Hina Khawaja Bayat as Shabana (Mano's mother)
Fazila Kaiser as Tahera (Maryam's mother)
Farhan Ali Agha as Wajahath (Maryam's father)
Kaiser Khan Nizamani as Haider (Zaman's father)
Annie Zaidi as Rayana (Zaman's mother)
Munawwar Saeed as Irfan (Shehroze's father)
Sajida Syed as Tabinda (Shehroze's mother)
Naheed Shabbir as Annie (Shehroze's sister)

Soundtrack 

The title song was sung by Zohaib Hassan. The music was composed by Waqar Ali and the lyrics were written by Sabir Zafar.

Broadcast 
It was aired on Hum Europe in UK, on Hum TV UK in the United States and Hum TV Mena in the United Arab Emirates on the same day. All International broadcasting aired the series in accordance with their standard times.

In May 2020, the show began airing in Mauritius on MBC 2.

See also 
 List of programs broadcast by Hum TV

References

External links
 Hum TV official website

2018 Pakistani television series debuts
Pakistani drama television series
Urdu-language television shows
Hum TV original programming